Royal Ordnance L9 is a British short-barrelled  gun used for combat engineering, particularly the demolition of defences.

Initially called Ordnance BL 6.5" Mk I, it was later renamed 165mm L9 Demolition Gun.

The HESH shell contains  of C-4 explosive.

The L9 gun was mounted on Royal Engineers AVRE versions of the Churchill and Centurion tanks after the Second World War.

The gun's primary purpose is the clearing of obstacles such as walls, fences, roadblocks or bunkers, and the destruction of buildings.

Variants

L9A1 - improved version
The  American  M728 Combat Engineer Vehicle variant of the M60 Patton tank used the M135 gun patterned after the British 165 mm.

Notes

References
 US Army Field Manual FM 5-103 Survivability, Appendix A, Headquarters, Department of the Army, Washington, DC 10 June 1985
 Hunnicutt, R. P. Patton: A History of the American Main Battle Tank. 1984; Presidio Press. .

Cold War weapons of the United Kingdom
Tank guns of the United Kingdom
164 mm artillery